Adeline Yen Mah (馬嚴君玲) is a Chinese-American author and physician. She grew up in Tianjin, Shanghai and Hong Kong, and is known for her autobiography Falling Leaves. She is married to Professor Robert A. Mah with whom she has a daughter, and a son from a previous marriage.

Life
Yen Mah had an older sister called Lydia (Jun-pei) and three older brothers, Gregory (Zi-jie), Edgar (Zi-lin), and James (Zi-jun). She has stated in Falling Leaves that she did not use the real names of her siblings and their spouses to protect their identities but she did, however, use the real names of her father, stepmother, aunt and husband, while referring to her paternal grandparents only by the Chinese terms 'Ye Ye'  and 'Nai Nai'.

Yen Mah also writes of her grandfather's younger sister (Yan Shuzhen), whom she calls 'Grand Aunt'. She cites Yan Shuzhen as founder and president of the Shanghai Women's Commercial and Savings Bank. Shuzhen's colleagues would often call her 'Gong Gong', meaning Grand Uncle.

Yen Mah's Early life  
The story of Yen Mah's life from 1937 to 1952 is recorded in her autobiography, Chinese Cinderella.

Adeline Yen Mah was born in Tianjin, Republic of China on 30November 1937 to 30-year-old Joseph Yen (Yen Tsi-Rung), a businessman, and Ren Yong-ping, an accountant.

Yen Mah's legal birthday is 30 November, as her father did not record her date of birth and instead he gave her his own (a common practice prior to the establishment of the People's Republic of China in 1949). Two weeks after Yen Mah's birth, her mother died of puerperal fever and according to traditional Chinese beliefs, Yen Mah was called 'bad luck' by the rest of her family and because of this, was treated harshly throughout her childhood.

When Yen Mah was one year old in 1938, Joseph Yen married a half-French, half-Chinese (Eurasian) 17-year-old girl named Jeanne Virginie Prosperi. The children referred to her as Niang (娘 niáng, another Chinese term for mother), and she is called so throughout Chinese Cinderella. They had two children, Franklin and Susan (Jun-qing).

Yen Mah started attending kindergarten in 1941, aged 4. In her first week, she received a medal for topping her class.

In 1942, Yen Mah's father (Joseph) and stepmother (Jeanne) moved from Tianjin to Shanghai to a house along Avenue Joffre.

On 2 July 1943, Yen Mah's grandmother, Nai Nai, died of a stroke.

Shanghai 
Six weeks after the death of Nai Nai (Yen Mah's grandmother), in August 1943, Yen Mah and her full siblings joined them at the house afterward.

Two months after Yen Mah arrived in Shanghai, her grandfather, her Aunt Baba, James and Susan arrived (they delayed moving to observe the hundred days' mourning period for Nai Nai). When Susan arrived, she was too young and too close to Aunt Baba to recognise and like her mother, Niang, who thus beat her soundly in frustration and anger. Yen Mah intervened, leading Niang to declare that she would never forgive her.

In September 1948, Yen Mah's father and stepmother brought Yen Mah back to Tianjin, where she reattended her first school.

Hong Kong 
The Yen family later moved to Hong Kong when Yen Mah was eleven, and she transferred to Sacred Heart School and Orphanage (Sacred Heart Canossian College). However, in July 1951, aged 13, Yen Mah developed pneumonia. Her father visited her for the first time in many years.

Yen Mah's grandfather, Ye Ye, passed away on 27 March 1952 due to complications with his diabetes.

At the age of fourteen, as her autobiography states, Yen Mah won a playwriting competition for her work Gone With the Locusts, and her father allowed her to study in England with James.

University
Yen Mah left for the United Kingdom in August 1952, and studied medicine at the London Hospital Medical School, eventually establishing a medical practice in California. Before the start of her career in the United States, she had a brief relationship with a man named Karl, and practised medicine in a Hong Kong hospital at the behest of her father, who refused to give her air fare when she expressed plans to move to America. She has stated in an interview with the South China Morning Post that her father wanted her to become an obstetrician in the belief that women wanted treatment only from a female doctor, but as she hated obstetrics she became an anaesthesiologist instead.

Yen Mah's Later life 
On 13 May 1988, Yen Mah's father died.

Literary career
Yen Mah's autobiography, Falling Leaves, was published in 1997, shortly after Jung Chang's memoir Wild Swans. It made the New York Times Bestseller list, selling over a million copies worldwide and translated into twenty two languages. Beginning with her traumatic childhood under her stepmother's cruelty, it goes on to recount how, after Joseph Yen died, Prosperi had prevented his children from reading his will until her own death two years later. When the wills were read, Yen Mah had apparently been disinherited. The success of Falling Leaves prompted Yen Mah to quit medicine and devote her time to writing.

Falling Leaves was translated into Chinese for the Taiwan market. It was titled Luoyeguigen (T: 落葉歸根, S: 落叶归根, P: Luòyèguīgēn). Unlike other cases of memoirs, the novel was translated by the original writer.

Her second work, Chinese Cinderella, was an abridged version of her autobiography (until she leaves for England aged 14), and has sold over one million copies worldwide. It received numerous awards, including 
The Children's Literature Council of Southern California in 2000 for Compelling Autobiography; and the Lamplighter's Award from National Christian School Association for Contribution to Exceptional Children's Literature in June 2002.

Published in 2001, her third book, Watching the Tree, is about Chinese philosophy and traditional beliefs (including Traditional Chinese Medicine). A Thousand Pieces of Gold was published in 2002, and looks at events under the Qin and Han dynasties through Chinese proverbs and their origins in Sima Qian's history, Shiji.

Children's literature
Yen Mah has written three further books for children and young adults. Chinese Cinderella and the Secret Dragon Society, her first fiction work, is based on events in World War II, and Along the River, another fictional book based on Chinese history. China, Land of Dragons and Emperors is a non-fiction history book for young adults.

In 2004, Yen Mah was voted fourth on the New Zealand children's best seller lists.

Falling Leaves Foundation
Adeline Yen Mah is a Founder and President of the Falling Leaves Foundation, whose mission is "to understand the understanding between East and West" and provides funds for the study of Chinese history, language, and culture. There is also an award dedicated to teaching Australia over the Internet for free, and the foundation has established a poetry prize at UCLA. In 2013, she created an iPad game, PinYinPal, for learning Mandarin.

Bibliography
 Falling Leaves: Return to their Roots (1997) 
 Chinese Cinderella: The Secret Story of an Unwanted Daughter (1999)
 Watching the Tree: A Chinese Daughter Reflects on Happiness, Traditions, and Spiritual Wisdom (2000)
 A Thousand Pieces of Gold: A Memoir of China's Past through its Proverbs (2002)
 Chinese Cinderella and the Secret Dragon Society (2003)
 China, Land of Dragons and Emperors (2008)
 Along the River: A Chinese Cinderella Novel (2009); also published as Chinese Cinderella: The Mystery of the Song Dynasty Painting

References

Further reading
"Cinderella's Wisdom An interview with Adeline Yen Mah." Amazon.co.uk (Archive)

External links
 Official website
 Chinese Character A Day

1937 births
Chinese emigrants to the United States
Living people
Members of Committee of 100
Writers from Tianjin
American writers of Chinese descent
American autobiographers
Chinese autobiographers
Women autobiographers
American women non-fiction writers
Alumni of the London Hospital Medical College
21st-century American women